Terry County is a county located in the U.S. state of Texas. As of the 2020 census, its population was 11,831. Its county seat is Brownfield. The county was demarked in 1876 and organized in 1904. It is named for Benjamin Franklin Terry, a colonel in the Confederate Army. Terry County was one of 46 dry counties in the state of Texas, but is now a moist county. Terry County is one of the most productive pumpkin producing counties in the United States.

History

Terry County was formed from Bexar County in 1876 and named for Col. Benjamin Franklin Terry, who commanded the Terry's Texas Rangers in the Civil War.

In 1877, the ill-fated Nolan Expedition crossed the county in search of livestock stolen by Comanche renegades. The various Indian tribes had moved on by the time of white settlement, due to the depletion of the buffalo herds by hunters.

Terry County was organized in 1904, with Brownfield as the county seat.

The county was settled by ranchers such as Ira J. Coulver, J. R. Quinn, Englishman Q. Bone, and Marion V. Brownfield.

Terry County lies in the oil-rich north Permian Basin, and the discovery of oil in 1940 quickly led to production. By 1991 almost  of crude had been extracted from Terry County lands since 1940.

In 1991, Terry County was among the leading cotton counties in Texas.

Geography

Major highways
  U.S. Highway 62
  U.S. Highway 82
  U.S. Highway 380
  U.S. Highway 385
  State Highway 137

Adjacent counties
 Hockley County (north)
 Lynn County (east)
 Dawson County (southeast)
 Gaines County (south)
 Yoakum County (west)
 Cochran County (northwest)
 Lubbock County (northeast)

Demographics

Note: the US Census treats Hispanic/Latino as an ethnic category. This table excludes Latinos from the racial categories and assigns them to a separate category. Hispanics/Latinos can be of any race.

As of the census of 2000,  12,761 people, 4,278 households, and 3,247 families were residing in the county.  The population density was 14 people per square mile (6/km2).  The 5,087 housing units had an average density of 6 per square mile (2/km2).  The racial makeup of the county was 76.55% White, 5.00% African American, 0.53% Native American, 0.22% Asian,  14.30% from other races, and 3.40% from two or more races. About 44.09% of the population were Hispanics or Latinos of any race.

Of the 4,278 households,  35.80% had children under the age of 18 living with them, 59.70% were married couples living together, 11.90% had a female householder with no husband present, and 24.10% were not families. About 22.10% of all households were made up of individuals, and 12.30% had someone living alone who was 65 years of age or older.  The average household size was 2.76, and the average family size was 3.23.

The county's age distribution was 28.40% under 18, 9.50% from 18 to 24, 27.00% from 25 to 44, 20.60% from 45 to 64, and 14.60% who were 65 or older.  The median age was 35 years. For every 100 females, there were 108.00 males.  For every 100 females age 18 and over, there were 109.50 males.

The median income for a household in the county was $28,090, and for a family was $33,339. Males had a median income of $24,321 versus $20,131 for females. The per capita income for the county was $13,860.  About 19.20% of families and 23.30% of the population were below the poverty line, including 32.50% of those under age 18 and 13.90% of those age 65 or over.

Media
The county is served by a weekly newspaper, nearby station KPET 690 AM (Lamesa), and the various Lubbock radio and TV stations. KKUB-AM and KTTU-FM are licensed to Brownfield, but operate primarily from offices and studios in Lubbock.

Communities

Cities
 Brownfield (county seat)
 Wellman

Town
 Meadow

Unincorporated communities
 Needmore
 Tokio

Politics

Education
School districts serving the county include:
 Brownfield Independent School District
 Dawson Independent School District
 Loop Independent School District
 Meadow Independent School District
 O'Donnell Independent School District
 Ropes Independent School District
 Seagraves Independent School District
 Tahoka Independent School District
 Wellman-Union Consolidated Independent School District

The county is in the service area of South Plains College.

See also

 Recorded Texas Historic Landmarks in Terry County

References

External links

 Terry's Texas Rangers
 Terry County government’s website
 
 Terry County Profile from the Texas Association of Counties

 
1904 establishments in Texas
Populated places established in 1904
Majority-minority counties in Texas